Anisul is a Bangladeshi masculine given name that may refer to the following notable people:
Anisul Hakim (born 1975), Bangladeshi cricketer
Anisul Huq (disambiguation), multiple people
Anisul Islam Emon (born 1994), Bangladeshi cricketer
Anisul Islam Mahmud (born 1947), Bangladeshi Minister of Environment and Forest 
Anisul Islam Mondal (born 1966), Bangladeshi politician

Bangladeshi masculine given names